Ricardo Sóstenes Mejía Berdeja (born 26 June 1968) is a Mexican politician affiliated with the Convergence. As of 2013 he served as Deputy of the LXII Legislature of the Mexican Congress representing Guerrero.

References

1968 births
Living people
Politicians from Torreón
Citizens' Movement (Mexico) politicians
21st-century Mexican politicians
Deputies of the LXII Legislature of Mexico
Members of the Chamber of Deputies (Mexico) for Guerrero